USS Broome (DD-210/AG-96) was a Clemson-class destroyer in the United States Navy. She was named after Marine Corps Lieutenant Colonel John L. Broome.

Construction and commissioning
Broome was launched 14 May 1919, by William Cramp & Sons, Philadelphia; sponsored by Miss Mary Josephine Heyworth Broome, granddaughter of Lieutenant Colonel Broome, and commissioned 31 October 1919.

Service history
Broome left New York Navy Yard in May 1920 for duty in European waters. She cruised between English and French ports, as well as in the Baltic Sea and Mediterranean. At the end of the year, she reported to the Asiatic Fleet. After two years, she returned to the United States and went out of commission at San Diego 30 December 1922.

Broome was recommissioned 5 February 1930 and thereafter served actively with the fleet in the Pacific until 1939, except for a period in reduced commission during 1934. In May 1939, Broome arrived at Norfolk Navy Yard for duty in the Atlantic. In 1941, she was attached to Destroyer Division 63, Patrol Force, and operated with the Neutrality Patrol on the United States East Coast. Later that year, she served as a convoy escort between Iceland and the United States.

From January 1942 until May 1945, Broome engaged in convoy escort, patrol, and training operations in U.S. East Coast, Icelandic, Canadian, and Caribbean waters. In addition, she escorted several trans-Atlantic convoys to North Africa and the United Kingdom.

Convoys escorted

Disposal
On 4 May 1945 Broome arrived at Charleston Navy Yard for overhaul and on 23 May her designation was changed to AG-96. On 10 June 1945, as a unit of the Atlantic Fleet attached to the Operational Training Command, she reported for duty at Guantánamo Bay, Cuba, where she served until December 1945. On 10 December she proceeded to Philadelphia and commenced her pre-inactivation overhaul. Broome was decommissioned 20 May 1946 and sold 20 November 1946.

As of 2015, no other U.S. Navy ship has been named Broome.

References

External links
Photos 
http://www.navsource.org/archives/05/210.htm

Clemson-class destroyers
World War II destroyers of the United States
World War II auxiliary ships of the United States
Ships built by William Cramp & Sons
1919 ships